18th Politburo may refer to:
 18th Politburo of the Chinese Communist Party
 Politburo of the 18th Congress of the All-Union Communist Party (Bolsheviks)
 18th Politburo of the Communist Party of Czechoslovakia